John L. Rabb is a former bishop suffragan of the Episcopal Diocese of Maryland. He is a graduate DePauw University, the University of Iowa, and the former Episcopal Divinity School (1976). He was consecrated on October 10, 1998, and retired on January 1, 2011. Rabb's predecessor as suffragan was Charles Lindsay Longest (1989–97).

External links 
Diocese of Maryland Elects Suffragan Bishop
Bishop Suffragan Rabb announces retirement
John Rabb '66 Eyes "Very Active Retirement"

Living people
Year of birth missing (living people)
Episcopal bishops of Maryland
DePauw University alumni
University of Iowa alumni
Episcopal Divinity School alumni